Rafael Eduardo Acosta Cammarota (born 13 February 1989 in Caracas) is a Venezuelan footballer who plays for Alki Oroklini. His main position is central midfielder, but he can play on the right wing.

Club career
Acosta started his professional career at Cagliari where he made his first team debut in a Coppa Italia match on 12 December 2007 against Sampdoria, which Cagliari won 1–0 to. He replaced Enrico Cotza at half-time. In January 2010, he was loaned to Greek second division side Diagoras until the end of the 2009–10 season.

International stats

Honours

ACCD Mineros de Guayana
Copa Venezuela: 2011

References

External links

1989 births
Living people
Association football midfielders
Footballers from Caracas
Venezuelan footballers
Venezuela international footballers
Venezuela under-20 international footballers
2015 Copa América players
Cagliari Calcio players
Diagoras F.C. players
Real Murcia Imperial players
A.C.C.D. Mineros de Guayana players
Club Olimpia footballers
Independiente F.B.C. footballers
Alki Oroklini players
Olympiakos Nicosia players
FC Politehnica Iași (2010) players
Venezuelan expatriate footballers
Expatriate footballers in Italy
Expatriate footballers in Greece
Expatriate footballers in Spain
Expatriate footballers in Paraguay
Expatriate footballers in Cyprus
Expatriate footballers in Romania
Venezuelan expatriate sportspeople in Italy
Venezuelan expatriate sportspeople in Greece
Venezuelan expatriate sportspeople in Spain
Venezuelan expatriate sportspeople in Paraguay
Venezuelan expatriate sportspeople in Cyprus
Venezuelan expatriate sportspeople in Romania